Wherowhero Lagoon is a lagoon in the Gisborne Region of New Zealand. Restoration efforts are currently underway, as a part of a nationwide effort to clean up New Zealand's waterways.

References

External links
GSC

Lagoons of New Zealand
Landforms of the Gisborne District